Jorge Scientific Corporation is an American private military company with its headquarters located in Arlington, Virginia, providing counter insurgency and intelligence, secure logistics and technology, advanced cyber  network infrastructure, analysis and program management services to U.S. defense, Intelligence and federal civilian government customers. The firm has additional offices in the U.S.A and Afghanistan.

History

The company was established in 1986 by Judith Jorge Hartman, the founder and chairman.  Founded as a small business in 1986, Jorge Scientific has grown into a company with nearly 300 employees working at sites around the world.  In 2009, Chris Torti joined Jorge as the company's President and CEO.

Services
Jorge Scientific says it provides "mission-critical national security solutions" to the U.S. armed forces, intelligence communities and federal civilian agencies.  The firm provides adaptive support focused on counterinsurgency and intelligence, secure logistics and classified technology, cyber defense, advanced infrastructure, legal analysis and program management. The company has four major units, including the Vital Missions Group, the Essential Logistics Group, the Cyber Solutions Group and the Special Analysis Group.

Controversy

The company made international headlines in October 2012 when two former employees  leaked a video to ABC News showing key personnel at the company drunk or under the influence of narcotics during parties that were allegedly thrown “every other day” at the  Jorge Scientific operations centre in Kabul.

The video primarily showed the security manager downing large quantities of vodka, while the medical officer, Kevin Carlson, was in an incoherent state after injecting himself with ketamine. Furthermore, much of this behaviour was done while personnel were armed and had loaded weaponry on them. A full scale external investigation has been instigated by Jorge.

In a statement from Jorge President and CEO Chris Torti, the company addressed the allegations of misconduct.

References

Defense companies of the United States
Companies established in 1986
Companies based in Arlington County, Virginia
1986 establishments in Virginia